West Wittering is a village and civil parish situated on the Manhood Peninsula in the Chichester district of West Sussex, England. The sandy beach has been described as having excellent water quality.

The population in 1872 was 616. The 2001 census records a population of 2,684. There is a primary school.

Governance
An electoral ward in the same name exists. This ward includes some of Birdham and at the 2011 Census had a total population of 4,472.

Natural history
Part of the Site of Special Scientific Interest Bracklesham Bay runs in between the coastline in the parish.

Chichester Harbour, a Site of Special Scientific Interest is partly within the parish. This is a wetland of international importance, a Special Protection Area for wild birds and a Special Area of Conservation. The harbour is of particular importance for wintering wildfowl and waders of which five species reach numbers which are internationally important.
The beach is situated on the Chichester Harbour, which is a protected Area of Outstanding Natural Beauty. 
The beach is well-known for its windsurfing and kitesurfing conditions. 
The beach is managed by the National Trust, and has been designated as a Site of Special Scientific Interest due to its rare habitats and wildlife.
It is considered to be one of the best beaches in the UK for swimming due to its clean water and gently sloping shoreline

Gallery

Notable residents

Sarah Ayton, Olympic gold medalist.
Michael Ball, actor and singer.
Nicholas Lyndhurst, actor.
Bevil Mabey (1916–2010), businessman and inventor.
Keith Richards of the Rolling Stones.
 Lord Nicholas Gordon Lennox, diplomat and son of the Duke of Richmond.
Sir Henry Royce, engineer, designer of Rolls-Royce cars and aero-engines. From 1917 until his death in 1933.
Kate Winslet, actress.

Bibliography 
The locality is referred to in Giles Cooper's Unman, Wittering and Zigo.

J.M. Wilson Imperial Gazetteer of England and Wales 1872
Clare Jerrold Picturesque Sussex, Hove, Combridge 1932

References

External links

Villages in West Sussex
Populated coastal places in West Sussex
Seaside resorts in England
Beaches of West Sussex